Darlan Pereira Mendes (born 16 April 1998), sometimes known as just Darlan, is a Brazilian professional footballer who plays as a midfielder for Grêmio.

Professional career
Darlan joined the youth academy of Grêmio at the age of 12. Darlan made his professional debut with Grêmio in a 3–0 Campeonato Gaúcho win over São José-PA on 9 March 2019.

Honours
Grêmio
Recopa Sudamericana: 2018
Campeonato Gaúcho: 2018, 2019, 2020, 2021

References

External links
 Grêmio Profile

1998 births
Living people
People from São Borja
Brazilian footballers
Association football midfielders
Campeonato Brasileiro Série A players
Grêmio Foot-Ball Porto Alegrense players
Esporte Clube Juventude players
Sportspeople from Rio Grande do Sul